Billy Peach (born March 28, 1990) is a former professional Canadian football offensive lineman who played for one seasons for the Calgary Stampeders of the Canadian Football League (CFL) in 2013. After playing college football for the Jacksonville Dolphins, he was drafted in the third round, 19th overall by the Stampeders in the 2012 CFL Draft, and signed a professional contract with the team on December 5, 2012. He played in three games in 2013, and spent the entire 2014 season on the team's practice roster. He was released before the start of the 2015 season on May 14, 2015.

References

External links
Calgary Stampeders bio

1990 births
Living people
Canadian football offensive linemen
American football offensive linemen
Canadian players of American football
Jacksonville Dolphins football players
Calgary Stampeders players
Players of Canadian football from Newfoundland and Labrador
Sportspeople from St. John's, Newfoundland and Labrador